Lisa Kitagawa is an American politician and former academic administrator serving as a member of the Hawaii House of Representatives from the 48th district. She assumed office on November 6, 2018.

Early life and education 
A fourth generation Japanese American, Kitagawa was born and raised in Kaneohe, Hawaii. After graduating from James B. Castle High School, she earned a Bachelor of Science degree in family resources and Master of Education from the University of Hawaiʻi at Mānoa.

Career 
Kitagawa began her career as a faculty and student services specialist at the University of Hawaiʻi at Mānoa. She also worked in the office of State Representative Aaron Ling Johanson. She was elected to the Hawaii House of Representatives in 2018, succeeding Jarrett Keohokalole.

References 

Living people
People from Honolulu County, Hawaii
University of Hawaiʻi at Mānoa alumni
Democratic Party members of the Hawaii House of Representatives
Year of birth missing (living people)
Hawaii politicians of Japanese descent
American women of Japanese descent in politics
21st-century American women